The Magallanes Region, officially the Magallanes y la Antártica Chilena Region, is one of Chile's 16 first order administrative divisions. It is the southernmost, largest, and second least populated region of Chile. It comprises four provinces: Última Esperanza, Magallanes, Tierra del Fuego, and Antártica Chilena.

Magallanes's geographical features include Torres del Paine, Cape Horn, Tierra del Fuego island, and the Strait of Magellan. It also includes the Antarctic territory claimed by Chile. Despite its large area, much of the land in the region is rugged or closed off for sheep farming, and is unsuitable for settlement. 80% of the population lives in the capital Punta Arenas, a major market city and one of the main hubs for Antarctic exploration.

The main economic activities are sheep farming, oil extraction, and tourism. It is also the region with the lowest poverty level in Chile (5.8%); households in Magallanes have the highest income of any region in Chile.

Since 2017, the region has had its own time zone. It uses the summer time for the whole year (UTC−3).

Geography

The region contains mountainous peaks and glaciers in the far north, including elements of the Patagonian Ice Sheet. Further south there are other mountain ranges such as the Cerro Toro and numerous surface waters including the Seno Última Esperanza, Eberhard Fjord and Lago Grey. Protected areas include the Torres del Paine National Park and the Cueva del Milodon Natural Monument. At the latter, remains have been discovered of the extinct ground sloth as well as of prehistoric man dating to circa 10,000 BC.

The topography can be divided in four regions: an outer archipelago region to the west and south, a mountain region in the west and south, a plains region in the northeast plus a sub-Andean zone in-between the last two zones.

Climate

The region is characterized by low temperatures and strong winds throughout the year. The region has five different climatic types, owing to the diversity in altitudes and the width of the region. Owing to its proximity to 60°S (a zone characterized by low pressure systems and subpolar cyclones), frontal systems regularly pass through the region.

The westernmost islands have a cold, humid and rainy climate, being exposed to strong winds and low temperatures throughout the year. Precipitation decreases and temperatures increase moving eastwards. These islands are the wettest places in Chile, particularly on Guarello Island where it can record  during the wettest years. Precipitation is high throughout the year though fall tends to be the wettest season.

Immediately to the east of the westernmost islands, east of the Andes and bordered by the Cordillera Paine to the north and the Brunswick Peninsula to the south, the climate is much drier. The Andes to the west block most of the precipitation, causing most of the air coming in to be dry. During winters, precipitation mainly falls as snow. Due to the close proximity to the ocean, winters are not cold and snow cover does not last long.

In the easternmost parts of the region, including much of Tierra del Fuego province, a cold steppe climate prevails. Temperatures are cold while precipitation is lower than areas to the west.

Corresponding to the Southern Patagonian Ice Field, located at higher altitudes, temperatures are cold enough to maintain permanent ice fields. Mean temperatures are below  in all months while precipitation (mostly as snow) is abundant year round, receiving . These areas have a polar climate.

In the southernmost islands, south of Tierra del Fuego and the Strait of Magellan, a tundra climate prevails. These islands are strongly influenced by the surrounding Pacific ocean to the west and southwest and the Drake Passage to the south, resulting in constant temperatures throughout the year. Mean annual temperatures are between  while precipitation is high, with most places receiving . In sheltered areas, precipitation is below . Summers are the warmest and the wettest season in these islands.

Provinces and communes

Demographics

The population of Magallanes is one of the lowest in Chile, as one of the last regions colonized and populated.

In the 1854 census counted 158 settlers, concentrated in Punta Arenas. The native population in 1830, according to King, amounted to approximately 2,200, with about 400 in western Patagonia and approximately 1,600 in the southern Straits.

The census of 1875 recorded 1,144 inhabitants and in 1895 the population had risen to 5,170 inhabitants, mostly concentrated in the city of Punta Arenas and its surroundings.

The installation of the cattle ranches attracted people from Europe (mostly Croats, British, Swiss and Italians) and southern Chile (mostly from Chiloé Archipelago), which greatly increased the population of the region.

Punta Arenas is said to have the largest percentage of Croatians in the world outside Croatia and the former Yugoslavia; Punta Arenas also has the largest percentage of residents of British descent in the whole Chile. There is a higher proportion of non-Spanish Europeans there as well (esp. Scots and Greeks), and descendants of Germans, Dutch, Danes and other Scandinavians, Russians and Portuguese peoples.

From the late 18th century to the opening of the Panama Canal in 1914, thousands of trans-oceanic voyages stopped by Punta Arenas as the most convenient strait between the Atlantic and Pacific oceans. The settlement of Punta Arenas and the Magellan and Chilean Antarctica Region is a result of its historic use as a hub for international travel.

In the 1907 census, the Territory of Magellan had 17,330 inhabitants, distributed as follows:
– City of Punta Arenas: 12,785 hab.
– Patagonia Chilena: 1,094 hab.
– Pen. of Brunswick: 1,062 hab.
– Tierra del Fuego: 1,626 hab.
– Beagle Channel: 184 inhabitants.
– Last Hope: 392 inhabitants.
– Baker River: 187 inhabitants.

This proportional distribution has persisted, with the bulk of the regional population in the city of Punta Arenas, and in the provincial capitals Puerto Natales, Porvenir (Spanish for "future") and Puerto Williams, one of the world's southernmost cities.

In the past 50 years, the population has increased moderately as shown below, but the region still has one of the lowest population densities in the country. The population remains mostly urban and concentrated in Punta Arenas.

Census
 1952: 55,206 hab.
 1960: 73,358 hab.
 1970: 89,443 hab.
 1982: 131,914 hab.
 1992: 143,198 hab.
 2002: 150,826 hab.
 2017: 165,593 hab.

The most populated cities (2002 census) are Punta Arenas (116,005 inhabitants), Puerto Natales (16,978) Porvenir (4,734), Puerto Williams (1,952), and Cerro Sombrero (687).

Education
University of Magellan (UMAG) is a university in the southern Chilean city of Punta Arenas. It is part of the Chilean Traditional Universities. The University of Magellan was established in 1981 during the economic reforms of Chile's military regime as the successor of Universidad Técnica del Estado's Punta Arenas section.  Universidad Técnica del Estado had established the Punta Arenas section in 1961. The University of Magellan have campuses in Punta Arenas and Puerto Natales as well as a university centre in Puerto Williams. University of Magellan publishes the humanities and social sciences journal Magallania twice a year.

Gallery

See also

Chilean Antarctic Territory
Cerro Toro
Eberhard Fjord
Flag of Magallanes
Tierra del Fuego Gold Rush
Governorate of New León

References

Sources
 C. Michael Hogan (2008) Cueva del Milodon, The Megalithic Portal, ed. A. Burnham The Megalithic Portal

External links
 Gobierno Regional Magallanes y Antártica Chilena official website 
 Cape Horn Biosphere Reserve
 BBC article: "Lake disappears suddenly in Chile"

 
Patagonia
Regions of Chile